The 1995 World Table Tennis Championships men's singles were the 43rd edition of the men's singles championship. 

Kong Linghui defeated Liu Guoliang in the final, winning three sets to two to secure the title.

Results

See also
 List of World Table Tennis Championships medalists

References

-